Albert William Flewitt (10 February 1872 – 1943) was an English footballer who played at inside-forward.

Biography 
Flewitt was born in Beeston, Nottinghamshire. He turned professional with Lincoln City in August 1893. He joined Everton in August 1895 but just five months later moved on to West Bromwich Albion. Flewitt then played for Bedminster F.C. from June 1899 to May 1900, the year the club merged with Bristol City. He died in Nottingham in 1943.

References 
 

1872 births
1943 deaths
People from Beeston, Nottinghamshire
Footballers from Nottinghamshire
English footballers
Association football forwards
Lincoln City F.C. players
Everton F.C. players
West Bromwich Albion F.C. players
Bristol City F.C. players
Bedminster F.C. players
English Football League representative players